Zeng Xiujun (born 10 February 1979) is a Chinese sprinter who specialized in the 100 metres. Her personal best time is 11.25 seconds, achieved in April 1998 in Chengdu.

She finished eighth in 4 × 100 m relay at the 2000 Olympic Games, together with teammates Liu Xiaomei, Qin Wangping and Li Xuemei. At the 2002 Asian Games she won a gold medal in relay; at the 2002 World Cup she finished seventh in the same event.

Achievements

References

1979 births
Living people
Chinese female sprinters
Athletes (track and field) at the 2000 Summer Olympics
Olympic athletes of China
Asian Games medalists in athletics (track and field)
Athletes (track and field) at the 2002 Asian Games
Universiade medalists in athletics (track and field)
Asian Games gold medalists for China
Medalists at the 2002 Asian Games
Universiade silver medalists for China
Medalists at the 2001 Summer Universiade
Olympic female sprinters
21st-century Chinese women